Laura Abbot is an American writer of over a dozen romance novels in the Harlequin Superromance and Love Inspired Historical series.

Early life
Laura Abbot was born in Kansas City, Missouri, the eldest of three children.  Abbot, a tomboy, spent a great deal of time with her grandmothers, who encouraged her love of reading and writing.

Career
Abbot found college liberating and worked hard to graduate in only three years.  She became a teacher, and, for over twenty-five years taught secondary English.  After Abbot retired from teaching, she began to write.  She sold her first romance novel to Harlequin Enterprises in 1994.  Harlequin has since published well over a dozen of her novels, mainly in the SuperRomance and Love Inspired Historical categories.  Her novel, My Name is Nell was nominated for a Romantic Times Magazine award for Best Harlequin SuperRomance in 2003. and "You're My Baby" was the winner of the Colorado Romance Writers Award of Excellence in Long Contemporary.

Bibliography

Single Novels
Mating for Life 1995/Mar
Trial Courtship 1999/May
A Summer Place 2002/Dec
Second Honeymoon 2005/Sep
A Letter for Annie 2009/Apr
Belleporte Summer (2011)
Change of Heart (2011)
Honeymoon at Home (2011)

Class Act Series
Class Act 1998/08
You're My Baby 2002/Apr

Marriage of Inconvenience Series Multi-Author
This Christmas 1996/Nov

Women Who Dare Series Multi-Author
Where There's Smoke... 1997/Jun

By the Year 2000: Marriage Series Multi-Author
The Wedding Vow 1998/Dec

Welcome to Riverbend Series Multi-Author
Homecoming 2000/Sep

Hometown U.S.A. Series Multi-Author
A Country Practice 2001/Feb
My Name is Nell 2003/Oct

9 Months Later Series Multi-Author
You're My Baby 2002/Apr

Single Father Series Multi-Author
The Wrong Man 2004/Mar

Everlasting Love Series Multi-Author
Stranger At The Door 2008/Aug

Anthologies in collaboration
Sanctuary 2003/Dec (with Pamela Bauer, Judith Bowen, K.N. Casper, Brenda Novak and Caron Todd)
Baby in the House / My Name is Nell 2004/Jan (with Pamela Bauer)
Wrong Man / Daddy Quest 2004/May (with Lori Handeland)
Stranger at the Door / To Save a Family 2008/Oct (with Anna DeStefano)

References

External links
Biography at Super Authors
Laura Abbot in Fantastic Fiction
Author Profile at Romantic Times

1930s births
Living people
Writers from Kansas City, Kansas
American romantic fiction novelists
American women novelists
20th-century American novelists
21st-century American novelists
Women romantic fiction writers
20th-century American women writers
21st-century American women writers